Idlès (Arabic: إدلس) is a municipality in Tazrouk District, Tamanrasset Province, Algeria. According to the 2008 census it has a population of 4,945, up from 3,791 in 1998, with an annual growth rate of 2.7%. Its postal code is 11110 and its municipal code is 1105. The largest nearby city is Tamanrasset; other smaller towns include In Amguel to the west and Tazrouk to the south.

Geography

The town lies on the eastern bank of the Oued Tarouda. The surrounding area belongs to the West Saharan montane xeric woodlands ecoregion.

Climate

Idlès has a hot desert climate (Köppen climate classification BWh), with very hot summers and mild winters, and very little precipitation throughout the year. Compared to other towns in the Sahara of southern Algeria its summers are less hot and it receives somewhat more precipitation due to its altitude.

Transportation

Idlès lies just north of the N55 national highway, which leads west to In Amguel and east to Bordj El Houasse. Another road leads south from the highway to Tazrouk.

Education

1.7% of the population has a tertiary education (the equal lowest in the province), and another 10.6% has completed secondary education. The overall literacy rate is 65.1%, and is 79.9% among males and 48.4% among females.

Localities
The commune is composed of six localities:

Idlès
Mertoutek
Hirhafek
Tizaït
Tassili Alaksad Partie Nord
Amguid

References

Neighbouring towns and cities

Communes of Tamanrasset Province
Tuareg